Landmark (formerly known as Parkers-Iron Springs) is a census-designated place (CDP) in Pulaski County, Arkansas, United States. Per the 2020 census, the population was 3,585. It is part of the Little Rock–North Little Rock–Conway Metropolitan Statistical Area.

Geography
Landmark is located at  (34.609573, -92.321972).

There is a small lake, Landmark Lake.

Demographics

2020 census

Note: the US Census treats Hispanic/Latino as an ethnic category. This table excludes Latinos from the racial categories and assigns them to a separate category. Hispanics/Latinos can be of any race.

2000 Census
As of the census of 2000, there were 3,499 people, 1,434 households, and 1,059 families residing in the CDP. The racial makeup of the CDP was 85.05% White, 11.37% Black or African American, 0.40% Native American, 0.51% Asian, 0.74% from other races, and 1.91% from two or more races.  1.66% of the population were Hispanic or Latino of any race.

There were 1,434 households, out of which 26.5% had children under the age of 18 living with them, 59.8% were married couples living together, 10.7% had a female householder with no husband present, and 26.1% were non-families. 22.2% of all households were made up of individuals, and 6.6% had someone living alone who was 65 years of age or older.  The average household size was 2.44 and the average family size was 2.82.

In the CDP, the population was spread out, with 20.9% under the age of 18, 8.4% from 18 to 24, 29.4% from 25 to 44, 29.7% from 45 to 64, and 11.5% who were 65 years of age or older.  The median age was 40 years. For every 100 females, there were 96.7 males.  For every 100 females age 18 and over, there were 96.7 males.

The median income for a household in the CDP was $39,766, and the median income for a family was $47,813. Males had a median income of $31,782 versus $25,205 for females. The per capita income for the CDP was $19,508.  About 3.4% of families and 4.6% of the population were below the poverty line, including 4.8% of those under age 18 and 1.1% of those age 65 or over.

Education
Landmark is part of the Pulaski County Special School District. It has one school in the CDP, Landmark Elementary School, whose mascot is the Cardinals.

Landmark CDP is divided between Landmark and Daisy Bates elementary schools, and all parts are zoned to Fuller Middle School and Wilbur D. Mills High School.

References

Census-designated places in Pulaski County, Arkansas
Census-designated places in Arkansas
Census-designated places in Little Rock–North Little Rock–Conway metropolitan area